Pteria peasei, common name swift wing oyster, is a species of bivalve mollusc in the family Pteriidae.

Distribution
This species is present in the Indo-West Pacific from Myanmar to the Philippines; north to Japan and south to northern Australia.

Description

References

Pteriidae
Molluscs described in 1872